Bandage scissors, or bandage forceps, are scissors that often have an angled tip with a blunt tip on the bottom blade. This helps in cutting bandages without gouging the skin. 
Lister bandage scissors and utility bandage scissors exhibit the well known angle, while Knowles bandage scissors have blades that are either straight or curved. 

Bandage scissors are very popular in any health care facility because they are designed to safely lift bandages away from skin for easy cutting. The bottom blade of the scissor is longer and goes easily under the bandages. The blunt tip design of the scissor prevents accidental injury while making bandage removal very easy, smooth, and quick.

Uses
Bandage scissors are mostly used

 To size bandages and dressings
 To cut through medical gauze
 To cut through bandages already in place

History
It is unclear where or how they originated. There is record dating back to 1956 of Preston J. Burnham, M.D. of Salt Lake City using the well known angled blade as opposed to scissors that are straight. There is also mention of bandage scissors within clinical notes on a tape dispenser dating from 1948 although the photo is unclear as to the shape of the scissors.

See also
 Instruments used in general surgery
 Trauma shears

References

External links 
 See Bandage Scissor Photo
 See Types of Bandage Scissor i.e. Lister Bandage Scissor and Burns Plaster Shears Scissor

Surgical scissors